The 1994 Fordham Rams football team was an American football team that represented Fordham University during the 1994 NCAA Division I-AA football season. Fordham did not win a game and finished last in the Patriot League.

In their first year under head coach Nick Quartaro, the Rams compiled an 0–11 record. Mark Mooney, Maurice O'Shea, Chris Ross and Jeff Rupp were the team captains.

The Rams were outscored 315 to 146. Their winless (0–5) conference record placed last in the six-team Patriot League standings. This was Fordham's fifth consecutive year finishing last, after beginning Patriot League play in 1990.

Fordham played its home games at Jack Coffey Field on the university's Rose Hill campus in The Bronx, in New York City.

Schedule

References

College football winless seasons
Fordham
Fordham Rams football seasons
Fordham Rams football